The Wallace H. Coulter Department of Biomedical Engineering is a department in the  Emory University School of Medicine, Georgia Institute of Technology's College of Engineering, and Peking University College of Engineering dedicated to the study of and research in biomedical engineering, and is named after the pioneering engineer and Georgia Tech alumnus Wallace H. Coulter. The graduate program has consistently ranked 2nd in USNWR rankings, while the undergraduate program ranks 1st in USNWR rankings.

History

Establishment 
Georgia Tech Provost and Vice President Michael E. Thomas and the Emory Dean of Medicine Thomas J. Lawley established an Advisory Committee of Georgia Tech and Emory faculty to address new opportunities in biomedical engineering. The Committee met initially on June 2, 1997 and was charged to develop a set of recommendations for an innovative and unique Department of Biomedical Engineering that is joint with Georgia Tech and Emory and that will enable both institutions to maximize research and educational opportunities in fields of intersecting biomedical interest. The Committee was required to report to Drs. Thomas and Lawley no later than August 15, 1997. The following is a summary of the recommendations from the Committee:

Naming 
Recognized as one of the most influential inventors of the twentieth century, Wallace Coulter studied electronics as a student at Georgia Tech in the early 1930s.

Recognition 
The National Academy of Engineering  awarded three professors in this department, Wendy C. Newstetter, Joseph M. Le Doux, and Paul Benkeser, with the  2019 Bernard M. Gordon Prize for Innovation in Engineering and Technology Education. They were recognized for "fusing problem-driven engineering education with learning science principles to create a pioneering program that develops leaders in biomedical engineering.”

Student organizations
Several student organizations exist within the department. The first organization to be founded is a local chapter of the Biomedical Engineering Society. The organization's award-winning newsletter, The Pioneer, branched off and became its own chartered organization. The Biomedical Research and Opportunities Society was founded in 2010 and went on to become Georgia Tech's "Best New Organization" for the academic year.

References

External links 
 
 BMES Chapter page

 

Georgia Tech colleges and schools
Emory University colleges and schools
Engineering universities and colleges in Georgia (U.S. state)
University subdivisions in Georgia (U.S. state)